Morris Community High School, or MCHS, is a public four-year high school located in the Chicago suburb of Morris, Illinois, a city 35 miles southwest of Chicago, Illinois, in the United States. It is the school of Morris Community High School District 101.

History
Morris High School can trace its history back to 1872 when classes were held on the second floor of the old Center School building.  The high school then moved to its own site on Franklin Street in 1898, with two wings added in 1914. A $1.2 million referendum in 1949 was successfully passed, and shortly thereafter the current building was built. It was added onto again in 1960.  It now sits in its current spot on Union Street in Morris.

Academics
In 2005, Morris had an average composite ACT score of 21.0, and graduated 89.6.% of its senior class. The average class size is 212. Morris has not made Adequate Yearly Progress on the Prairie State Achievements Examination, a state test part of the No Child Left Behind Act.

Athletics
Morris currently competes in the  Interstate Eight Conference Teams are stylized as the Redskins.

The poms team claims state titles for the last 11 years, totaling 22 titles with the Illinois Dance Team Association.  This past year they won titles through IDTA and the IHSA competition.  Morris won the state football championship in 1980, 1984, and 2005, but they have been State Runner-up 8 times out of a total of 11 State Championship trips. In a total of making the playoffs 82 times, they've only missed the playoffs 18 times. In 2021 the school board formed an advisory community committee to investigate the use of the Redskin mascot. It was the committees recommendation to stop use of the current Mascot. In January 2022, the school board voted to change the mascot name. The new name has not been chosen yet.

Activities

Baseball
Basketball
Bowling
Cross country
Color Guard
Winter Guard
Concert band
Cheerleading
Chorus
Football
Golf
Pom-pon
Scholastic Bowl
Soccer
Softball
Speech team
Swimming
Tennis
Track and field
Volleyball
Wrestling

Notable alumni

 Ed Brady — former NFL football player
 Kelly Dransfeldt — retired Major League Baseball player
 Billy Petrick — Major League Baseball player
 Scott Spiezio — retired Major League Baseball player
 Jimmy Stafford — member of the rock band Train

See also
 Native American mascot controversy
 Sports teams named Redskins

References

External links
 Morris Community High School — official website

Schools in Grundy County, Illinois
Public high schools in Illinois
1944 establishments in Illinois